Echinacea purpurea, the eastern purple coneflower, purple coneflower, hedgehog coneflower, or echinacea, is a North American species of flowering plant in the family Asteraceae. It is native to parts of eastern North America and present to some extent in the wild in much of the eastern, southeastern and midwestern United States as well as in the Canadian Province of Ontario. It is most common in the Ozarks and in the Mississippi/Ohio Valley. Its habitats include dry open woods, prairies and barrens.

Taxonomy
Echinacea is derived from Greek, meaning 'spiny one', in reference to the spiny sea urchins 'εχίνοι' which the ripe flower heads of species of this genus resemble. The epithet purpurea means 'reddish-purple'. Originally named Rudbeckia purpurea by Linnaeus in 1753 in Species plantarum 6, it was reclassified in 1794 by Conrad Moench, in a new genus named Echinacea purpurea (L.) Moench. In 1818, Thomas Nuttall describes a new variety that he named Rudbeckia purpurea var. serotina. Just two decades later, De Candolle raised him to the rank of species of the other genus Echinacea serotina (Nutt.) DC. (1836). In 2002, Binns et al. discovered a misapplication of the name Echinacea purpurea  for the taxon correctly named Echinacea serotina  in 1836. The authors proposed to retain the names not to cause confusion among gardeners and herbalists.
Other names include: Broad-leaved purple coneflower, Eastern Purple Coneflower, Hedgehog Coneflower, Echinacea.

Description
Depending on the climate, it blooms throughout summer into autumn. Its cone-shaped flowering heads are usually, but not always, purple in the wild. Its individual flowers (florets) within the flower head are hermaphroditic, having both male and female organs in each flower. It is pollinated by butterflies and bees. The alternate leaves, borne by a petiole from 0 to 17 cm, are oval to lanceolate, 5-30 x 5-12 cm; the margin is tightened to toothed.

The inflorescence is a capitulum, 7 to 15 cm in diameter, formed by a prominent domed central protuberance consisting of multiple small yellow florets. These are surrounded by a ring of pink or purple ligulate florets. The tubular florets are hermaphrodite while the ligular florets are sterile. The involucral bracts are linear to lanceolate. The plant prefers well-drained soils in full sun. The fruit is an achene, sought after by birds.

Cultivation

Echinacea purpurea is grown as an ornamental plant in temperate regions. It is ideal for curbs, walkways or beds. The flowers can also go into the composition of fresh bouquets. Numerous cultivars have been developed for flower quality and plant form. The plant grows in sun or light shade. It thrives in either dry or moist soil and can tolerate drought once established. The cultivars 'Ruby Giant' and ='Elbrook' have gained the Royal Horticultural Society's Award of Garden Merit.

Propagation
Echinacea purpurea is propagated either vegetatively or from seeds. Useful vegetative techniques include division, root cuttings, and basal cuttings. Clumps can be divided, or broken into smaller bunches, which is normally done in the spring or autumn. Cuttings made from roots that are "pencil-sized" will develop into plants when started in late autumn or early winter. Cuttings of basal shoots in the spring may be rooted when treated with rooting hormones, such as IBA at 1000 ppm.

Seed germination occurs best with daily temperature fluctuations or after stratification, which help to end dormancy. Seeds may be started indoors in advance of the growing season or outdoors after the growing season has started.

Ecology
Many pollinators are attracted to E. purpea. Bees that are attracted to the flowers include bumblebees, sweat bees, honey bees, the sunflower leafcutter bee, and the mining bee Andrena helianthiformis. Butterflies that visit include monarchs, swallowtail butterflies, and sulphur butterflies. Birds, particularly finches, eat the seeds and disperse them through their droppings.

Slugs and rabbits will also eat the foliage when young, or shortly after emerging in the spring. Additionally, roots can be damaged and eaten by gophers.

Chemistry
Echinacea purpurea contains alkamides, caffeic acid derivatives, polysaccharides, and glycoproteins. Nicotiflorin is the dominant flavonoid in E. purpurea, followed by the flavonoid rutin.

Traditional medicine

Native Americans used the plant as traditional medicine to treat many ailments.

References

purpurea
Flora of the United States
Butterfly food plants
Garden plants of North America
Medicinal plants of North America
Plants described in 1753
Taxa named by Carl Linnaeus